Walton Township is an inactive township in Washington County, in the U.S. state of Missouri.

Walton Township may have the name of Joseph H. Walton, an early settler.

References

Townships in Missouri
Townships in Washington County, Missouri